Ulster is one of the four provinces of Ireland.

Ulster may also refer to:

Places
 New Ulster Province, a province of New Zealand from 1841 to 1853
 Northern Ireland, a part of the United Kingdom formed in 1921 from six of the nine counties that made up the Irish province of Ulster at that time
 Ulster County, New York, United States
 Ulster, New York, a town in the County
 Ulster Township, Bradford County, Pennsylvania, United States

Transport
 HMS Ulster, the name of two ships of the Royal Navy
 Ulster and Delaware Railroad, also known as "the Ulster", serving New York's Ulster County and neighboring Delaware County
 a sports car variant of the Austin 7

Other
 Ulster (river), central Germany
 UTV (TV channel) previously known as Ulster Television or Ulster on air
 BBC Radio Ulster, a Northern Irish radio station from the BBC
 Ulster coat, a long, loose overcoat made of rough material
 "Ulster Covenant", a poem (also referred to as "Ulster 1912") written in 1912 by Rudyard Kipling
 Ulster F.C., a defunct football club
 Ulster nationalism, a movement that seeks the independence of Northern Ireland from the United Kingdom
 Ulster Rugby, a branch of the Irish Rugby Football Union and also the professional rugby team operated by this body